Mountain pass cycling milestones are signposts that provide cyclists with information about their current position with regard to the summit of the mountain pass. They always provide information for cyclists going uphill. Sometimes the signs are two-sided, thereby providing information also for cyclists going downhill.

Mountain pass cycling milestones are particularly useful to cyclists that are not familiar with the climbs. In general, they allow cyclists to schedule breaks as well as to plan food and liquid uptake. They furthermore can serve as motivational landmarks.

Local institutions invest in this cycling infrastructure to offer service to cyclists, thus promoting tourism in their region.

Type of information 
Mountain pass cycling milestones always carry a pictogram of a bicycle or cyclist and specify the following standard information 
 name of mountain pass
 altitude 
 distance to summit 
 average slope in the following section of the pass

Additional information found in some cases includes
 name and/or emblem of local institutions
 number of the road
 altitude of the summit 
 distances to villages or town close to summit
 distance travelled from the start of the mountain pass

Typically, the signposts are placed every kilometer such that the slope corresponds to the average across the next kilometer.

France 
Mountain pass cycling milestones have become common in many major mountain passes in the French Pyrenees and Alps. Often their design is chosen to resemble the main features of conventional French milestones, which is a white bottom and a yellow top.

Mountain passes that are known to have cycling milestones 
The following table lists mountain passes signposted with cycling milestones, ordered by the height of the summit. 
If a mountain pass is not included in the table below, that does not imply that it has no cycling milestones. It can likewise mean that is not yet documented in this table.

All signs display the standard information (see above). The table specifies the precision of the slope. Additional information and emblems (if any) are explained in the column with remarks.

References

External links 
 Rennrad, Pässe, Alpen, Pyrenäen, Touren, Schwarzwald, ... - quäldich.de - das Portal für Rennradfahrer. (In German)   
 Climbbybike.com - all cycling cols, tours and cyclo's to climb by bike worldwide 

Cycling infrastructure
Traffic signs
Mountain passes